Jean-François Anti (born 13 February 1971) is a French racing cyclist. He rode in the 1997 Tour de France.

References

1971 births
Living people
French male cyclists